Team Xecuter is a hacker group known for making mod chips and jailbreaking game consoles. Among console hackers, who primarily consist of hobbyists testing boundaries and believe in the open-source model, Team Xecuter was controversial for selling hacking tools for profit. Console systems targeted by the group include the Nintendo Switch, Nintendo 3DS, NES Classic Edition, Sony PlayStation, Microsoft Xbox and the Microsoft Xbox 360.

In September 2020 Canadian national, Gary "GaryOPA" Bowser, and French national, Max "MAXiMiLiEN" Louarn, were arrested for designing and selling "circumvention devices", in particular, products to circumvent Nintendo Switch copy protection, and were named, along with Chinese citizen Yuanning Chen, in a federal indictment filed in U.S. District Court in Seattle, WA on August 20, 2020. Each of the three men named in the indictment faced 11 felony counts, including conspiracy to commit wire fraud, conspiracy to circumvent technological measures and to traffic in circumvention devices, trafficking in circumvention devices, and conspiracy to commit money laundering. Bowser handled public relations for the group, which has been in operation since "at least" 2013. By October 2021, Bowser pled guilty to two charges related to distribution of Team Xecuter's devices, agreeing to pay a  penalty and to continue to work with authorities in their continued investigation of Team Xecuter in exchange for dropping the other nine charges against him. In December, he was ordered to pay another $10 million to Nintendo. On February 10, 2022, Bowser was sentenced to 40 months in prison.

Nintendo separately filed a civil lawsuit against Bowser in April 2021 related to three counts of copyright infringement, seeking damages of $2500 per trafficked device, and $150,000 for each copyright violation.

Nintendo has also successfully prevailed in other lawsuits involving resellers of Team Xecuter devices.

References

Further reading 

 
 
 
 
 
 

Hacker groups
Hacking in the 2000s
Hacking in the 2010s
Hacking in the 2020s
Nintendo Switch